A Cup of Coffee and New Shoes On (Albanian: Një filxhan kafe dhe këpucë të reja veshur) is a 2022 internationally co-produced drama film written and directed by Gentian Koçi. It is inspired on a real case where 2 deaf brothers suffer from a degenerative disease that will eventually leave them blind. It stars Edgar Morais and Rafael Morais. The film was selected to represent Albania in the Best International Feature Film category at the 95th Academy Awards. The film was nominated at the Tallinn Black Nights Film Festival in the Critics' Picks Strand section.

Synopsis 
Agim and Gezim are thirty-something identical twin brothers who have been deaf-mute from birth. They work and live together, sharing a bright, airy apartment in the Albanian capital Tirana. But as monozygotic twins they share more than space in each other's lives; they also have an identical genetic makeup. And lurking in their DNA is a time bomb, a rare and incurable inherited condition which means that both brothers will permanently and completely lose their sight as well their hearing.

Cast 
The actors participating in this film are:

 Edgar Morais as Gezim
 Rafael Morais as Agim
 Drita Kabashi as Ana

Idealization 
Koçi said he found it an intriguing idea to make a film that deals with complex and evolving human relationships and the fundamental question of what happens to a person, when they are completely immersed in darkness and communication with the world becomes difficult. The three lead actors and producer Blerina Hankollari spent six months learning Albanian sign language at the Albanian National Association of the Deaf (ANAD).

Release 
The film premiered on November 21, 2022, at the Tallinn Black Nights Film Festival. The film was released in Albanian theaters on November 24, 2022. In 2023 it should reach Portuguese theaters.

References

External links 

 

2022 films
2022 drama films
Albanian drama films
Greek drama films
Kosovan drama films
Portuguese drama films
Albanian-language films
Sign-language films
Films set in Albania
Films shot in Albania
Films about twin brothers
Films about deaf people
Films about blind people
Films about death